Sexual humiliation may refer to:
Sexual abuse, or non-consensual sexual humiliation
Erotic humiliation, or consensual sexual humiliation